Dentokrom (also written Dentukrom) is a town in the Western Region of Ghana. The town is north of Domunli on the Atlantic coast of Ghana. Other towns that surround Dentokrom are Domunli, Domun, Ejan, and Agufo.

References

Populated places in Jomoro Municipal District